The wedding of Prince Albert, Duke of York (later King George VI) and Lady Elizabeth Bowes-Lyon (later Queen Elizabeth The Queen Mother) took place on 26 April 1923 at Westminster Abbey. The bride was a member of the Bowes-Lyon family, while the groom is the son of King George V.

Courtship and proposals
Prince Albert, Duke of York, "Bertie" to the family, was the second son of King George V. He was second in line to succeed his father, behind his elder brother Edward, Prince of Wales. He initially proposed to Lady Elizabeth Bowes-Lyon in 1921, but she turned him down, being "afraid never, never again to be free to think, speak and act as I feel I really ought to". When he declared he would marry no one else, his mother, Queen Mary, visited Glamis, Elizabeth's home, to see for herself the girl her son wanted to marry. She became convinced that Elizabeth was "the one girl who could make Bertie happy", but nevertheless refused to interfere. At the same time, Elizabeth was courted by James Stuart, Albert's equerry, until he left the prince's service for a better-paid job in the American oil business.

In February 1922, Elizabeth was a bridesmaid at the wedding of Albert's sister, Princess Mary, to Viscount Lascelles. The following month, Albert proposed again, but she refused him once more. Eventually, on 13 January 1923, Elizabeth agreed to marry Albert, despite her misgivings about royal life.

Wedding

Prince Albert, Duke of York, and Lady Elizabeth Bowes-Lyon were married on 26 April 1923 in Westminster Abbey. The couple's wedding rings were crafted from 22 carat Welsh gold from the Clogau St David's mine in Bontddu. In the following years, the use of Clogau Gold within the wedding rings of the royal family became a tradition. In an unexpected and unprecedented gesture, Elizabeth laid her bouquet at the Tomb of The Unknown Warrior on her way into the Abbey, in memory of her brother Fergus. Ever since, the bouquets of subsequent royal brides have traditionally been laid at the tomb, though after the wedding ceremony rather than before.

Lady Elizabeth was attended by eight bridesmaids: 
The Lady Mary Cambridge (26), daughter of the Marquess and Marchioness of Cambridge, niece of Queen Mary and thus a cousin of the groom
The Lady May Cambridge (17), daughter of Princess Alice and the Earl of Athlone, niece of Queen Mary and thus first cousin of the groom
The Lady Mary Thynn (20), daughter of the Marquess and Marchioness of Bath
The Lady Katharine Hamilton (23), daughter of the Duke and Duchess of Abercorn
The Hon Diamond Hardinge (22), daughter of Lord and Lady Hardinge
The Hon Cecilia Bowes-Lyon (11), daughter of Lord and Lady Glamis, niece of the bride
The Hon Mary Elizabeth Elphinstone (11), daughter of Lord and Lady Elphinstone, niece of the bride
Miss Betty Cator (later sister-in-law to the bride, as Hon Mrs Michael Bowes-Lyon)

The newly formed British Broadcasting Company had wanted to record and broadcast the event on radio, but the Chapter vetoed the idea (although the Dean, Herbert Edward Ryle, was in favour). Albert's freedom in choosing Elizabeth, not a member of a royal family, though the daughter of a peer, was considered a gesture in favour of political modernisation; previously, princes were expected to marry princesses.

The event was not broadcast on the radio due to the Archbishop of Canterbury's concern "that men might listen to it in public houses".

Wedding attire

Bride's dress
Elizabeth's wedding dress was made from deep ivory chiffon moire, embroidered with pearls and a silver thread. It was intended to match the traditional Flanders lace provided for the train by Queen Mary. Elizabeth's dress, which was in the fashion of the early 1920s, was designed by Madame Handley-Seymour, dressmaker to Queen Mary. Its design was reportedly based on a dress created by Jeanne Lanvin and was "suggestive of a medieval Italian gown". Elizabeth chose not to wear a tiara, and instead a chaplet of leaves secured the veil.

A strip of Brussels lace, inserted in the dress, was a Strathmore family heirloom. A female ancestor of the bride wore it to a grand ball for "Bonnie Prince Charlie", Charles Edward Stuart.

The silver leaf girdle had a trail of spring green tulle, trailing to the ground; silver and rose thistle fastened it. According to an era news article: "In the trimming the bride has defied all old superstitions about the unluckiness of green." Elizabeth wore "an orange blossom wreath", which featured "white roses of York". The dress had two trains: "one fastened at the hips, the other floating from the shoulders".

Unlike more recent dresses, details of this one were publicly revealed in advance of the wedding day. However, the dress was worked on until the last possible opportunity: the day before the wedding, Elizabeth divided her time between the wedding rehearsal and her dressmakers.

A prototype of the wedding dress was sold at an auction in 2011 for £3,500. It was one of the three initial designs prepared for the wedding and the one used for the final design.

Groom's uniform
Prince Albert wore RAF full dress in the rank of group captain, his senior service rank at the time of his marriage.

Honeymoon
Upon their marriage, Elizabeth Bowes-Lyon was styled Her Royal Highness the Duchess of York. Following a wedding breakfast at Buckingham Palace prepared by chef Gabriel Tschumi, they honeymooned at Polesden Lacey, a manor house in Surrey, and then went to Scotland, where she caught "unromantic" whooping cough.

Footnotes

Notes

References

External links

 Order of Service for the wedding
  on The Royal Family channel

Albert, Duke of York, and Elizabeth Bowes-Lyon
1923 in London
Albert, Duke of York, and Elizabeth Bowes-Lyon
George VI
Queen Elizabeth The Queen Mother
April 1923 events
Albert, Duke of York, and Elizabeth Bowes-Lyon
1920s in the City of Westminster